This is a select bibliography of English language books (including translations) and journal articles about the history of Russia and its empire from 1991 to present. It specifically excludes topics related to the Dissolution of the Soviet Union; see Bibliography of the Post Stalinist Soviet Union for information on this subject. This bibliography is restricted to works about Russian history, and specifically excludes items such modern travel logs and guide books, popular culture, etc.

A brief selection of English translations of primary sources is included. The sections "General Surveys" and "Biographies" contain books; other sections contain both books and journal articles. Book entries have references to journal articles and reviews about them when helpful. Additional bibliographies can be found in many of the book-length works listed below; see Further Reading for several book and chapter-length bibliographies. The External Links section contains entries for publicly available select bibliographies from universities.

Inclusion criteria
Works included are referenced in the notes or bibliographies of scholarly secondary sources or journals. Included works should either be published by an academic or widely distributed publisher, be authored by a notable subject matter expert as shown by scholarly reviews and have significant scholarly journal reviews about the work. To keep the bibliography length manageable, only items that clearly meet the criteria should be included.

Citation style
This bibliography uses APA style citations. Entries do not use templates. References to reviews and notes for entries do use citation templates. Where books which are only partially related to Russian history are listed, the titles for chapters or sections should be indicated if possible, meaningful, and not excessive.

If a work has been translated into English, the translator should be included and a footnote with appropriate bibliographic information for the original language version should be included.

When listing works with titles or names published with alternative English spellings, the form used in the latest published version should be used and the version and relevant bibliographic information noted if it previously was published or reviewed under a different title.

General works
 Under construction

Eastern European studies
 Fritz, V. (2007). State-Building: A Comparative Study of Ukraine, Lithuania, Belarus, and Russia (1st ed.). Central European University Press.

Borderland studies
 Under construction

Topical works

The arts

 Shkandrij, M. (2001). Russia and Ukraine: Literature and the Discourse of Empire from Napoleonic to Postcolonial Times. Montreal & Kingston: McGill-Queen's Press.

Democracy and elections
 Fish, M. S. (2005). Democracy Derailed in Russia: The Failure of Open Politics. Cambridge: Cambridge University Press.

Economics

Empire
 Grigas, A. (2016). Beyond Crimea: The New Russian Empire. New Haven: Yale University Press.
 Grinëv, A. V. (2020). Russian Colonization of Alaska: Baranov's Era, 1799–1818 (R. L. Bland, Trans.). Lincoln: University of Nebraska Press.
 Miller, C. (2021). We Shall Be Masters: Russian Pivots to East Asia from Peter the Great to Putin. Cambridge: Harvard University Press.
 Rigby, T. (1978). The Soviet Regional Leadership: The Brezhnev Generation. Slavic Review, 37(1), pp. 1–24.

Energy
 Balmaceda, M. M. (2021). Russian Energy Chains: The Remaking of Technopolitics from Siberia to Ukraine to the European Union (Woodrow Wilson Center Series). New York: Columbia University Press.

Environment
 Gustafson, T. (2021). Klimat: Russia in the Age of Climate Change. Cambridge: Harvard University Press.

Foreign relations
 Ohanyan, A. (Ed.). (2018). Russia Abroad: Driving Regional Fracture in Post-Communist Eurasia and Beyond. Washington D.C.: Georgetown University Press.
 Orenstein, M. A. (2019). The Lands in Between: Russia vs. the West and the New Politics of Hybrid War. Oxford: Oxford University Press.
 Zloch-Christy, I. (2010). East-West Financial Relations: Current Problems and Future Prospects (Cambridge Russian, Soviet and Post-Soviet Studies). Cambridge: Cambridge University Press.

Gender and family
 Engel, B. A. (2021). Marriage, Household, and Home in Modern Russia from Peter the Great to Vladimir Putin (The Bloomsbury History of Modern Russia Series). London and New York: Bloomsbury Academic.
 Friedman, R. (2020). Modernity, Domesticity and Temporality in Russia: Time at Home. London: Bloomsbury.
 Ilic, M. (Ed.). (2017). The Palgrave Handbook of Women and Gender in Twentieth-Century Russia and the Soviet Union. Palgrave Macmillan.
 Kaminer, J. (2022). Haunted Dreams: Fantasies of Adolescence in Post-Soviet Culture (NIU Series in Slavic, East European, and Eurasian Studies). DeKalb: Northern Illinois University Press.
 Silvan, K. (2022). From State to Society: The Komsomol in Yeltsin’s Russia. Kritika: Explorations in Russian and Eurasian History, 23(2), 289–314.
 Tomiak, J. (1992). Education in the Baltic States, Ukraine, Belarus’ and Russia. Comparative Education, 28(1), 33–44.

LGBTQ
 Verpoest, L. (2017). The End of Rhetorics: LGBT policies in Russia and the European Union. Studia Diplomatica, 68(4), 3–20.

Judicial and legal
 Bækken, H. (2019). Law and Power in Russia: Making Sense of Quasi-Legal Practices. New York: Routledge.

Government
 Moses, J. C. (2014). The Political Resurrection of Russian Governors. Europe-Asia Studies, 66'''(9), 1395–1424.

Nationalism

 Aleksashenko, S. (2018). Putin’s Counterrevolution. Brookings Institution Press. 
 Bechev, D., Popescu, N., & Secrieru, S. (eds.). (2021). Russia Rising: Putin’s Foreign Policy in the Middle East and North Africa. London: I.B. Tauris.
 Confino, M. (1991). Solzhenitsyn, the West, and the New Russian Nationalism. Journal of Contemporary History, 26(3/4), 611–636. 
 Horvath, R. (2020). Putin's Fascists: Russkii Obraz and the Politics of Managed Nationalism in Russia. New York: Routledge.
 Hryb, O. (2020). Understanding Contemporary Ukrainian and Russian Nationalism: The Post-Soviet Cossack Revival and Ukraine's National Security. Stuttgart: ibidem-Verlag.
 Laruelle, M. (2008) Russian Eurasianism: An Ideology of Empire. Washington, D.C.: Baltimore: Johns Hopkins University Press.
 Laruelle, M. (2018). Russian Nationalism: Imaginaries, Doctrines, and Political Battlefields. London: Routledge.
 Kolstø, P., & Blakkisrud, H. (Eds.). (2016). The New Russian Nationalism: Imperialism, Ethnicity and Authoritarianism 2000–2015. Edinburgh University Press.
 Kolstø, P. (2016). Crimea vs. Donbas: How Putin Won Russian Nationalist Support—and Lost it Again. Slavic Review, 75(3), 702–725. 
 March, L. (2012). Nationalism for Export? The Domestic and Foreign-Policy Implications of the New "Russian Idea". Europe-Asia Studies, 64(3), 401–425. 
 Petro, N. N. (1990). Russian Nationalism: Toward a New Russian Federation. The Wilson Quarterly, 14(3), 114–122. 
 Shnirelman, V. A. (1999). Passions about Arkaim: Russian Nationalism, the Aryans, and the Politics of Archaeology. Inner Asia, 1(2), 267–282. 
 Verkhovsky, A. (2000). "Ultra-nationalists in Russia at the onset of Putin's rule". Nationalities Papers. 28(4): 707–722. 
 Wegren, S. K. (2022). Putin's Russia (8th ed.). Lanham: Rowman & Littlefield Publishers.
 Wegren, S. K. (2018) Putin's Russia: Past Imperfect, Future Uncertain (7th ed.). Lanham: Rowman & Littlefield Publishers.

Religion
 Adams, A. S., & Shevzov, V. (Eds.). (2018). Framing Mary: The Mother of God in Modern, Revolutionary, and Post-Soviet Russian Culture. DeKalb: Northern Illinois University Press.
 Sibgatulina, G. (2020). Languages of Islam and Christianity in Post-Soviet Russia (Studies in Slavic and General Linguistics). Leiden: Brill.

Russo-Ukrainian War

Other
 MacWilliams, B. (2014). With Light Steam: A Personal Journey through the Russian Baths (NIU Series in Slavic, East European, and Eurasian Studies). DeKalb: Northern Illinois University Press.
 Wegren, S. K. (with A. Nikulin and I. Trotsuk). (2020) Russia's Food Revolution: The Transformation of the Food System (Routledge Contemporary Russia and Eastern Europe Series). New York: Routledge.

Biographies
 Under construction

Vladimir Putin

Works below should strictly follow the guidelines for this bibliography. To avoid abuse, works here should have independent English language academic journal reviews, be published by a major independent company or organization, or reviews by major English language publications (e.g. New York Times, The Atlantic). This section is specifically for biographies; for topical studies see the appropriate section.
 * Short, P. (2022). Putin: His Life and Times. Bodley Head.

Works by Vladimir Putin
 Under Construction

Boris Yeltsin

 Aron, L. (2000). Boris Yeltsin: A Revolutionary Life. New York: HarperCollins.
 Colton, T. J. (2011). Yeltsin: A Life. New York: Basic Books.
 Ellison, H. J. (2006). Boris Yeltsin and Russia’s Democratic Transformation. Seattle: University of Washington Press.

Works by Boris Yeltsin
 Yeltsin, B. (1990). Against the Grain: An Autobiography (M. Glenny, Trans.; First Edition). New York: Simon & Schuster.
 Yeltsin, B. (1994). The Struggle for Russia. New York: Crown Publishing Group.

Historiography, identity and memory studies
 Mogilner, M. (2014). New Imperial History: Post-Soviet historiography in search of a new paradigm for the history of empire and nationalism. Revue d’études Comparatives Est-Ouest, 45(2), 25–67. 
 Siegelbaum, L. H. (2012). Whither Soviet History?: Some Reflections on Recent Anglophone Historiography. Region, 1(2), 213–230. 
 Weiss-Wendt, A., & Adler, N. (eds.). (2021). The Future of Soviet Past: The Politics of History in Putin's Russia. Bloomington: Indiana University Press.

Memory studies
 Adler, N. (2005). The Future of the Soviet past Remains Unpredictable: The Resurrection of Stalinist Symbols Amidst the Exhumation of Mass Graves. Europe-Asia Studies, 57(8), 1093–1119. 
 Hicks, J. (2020). The Victory Banner over the Reichstag: Film, Document, and Ritual in Russia's Contested Memory of World War II (Russian and East European Studies). Pittsburgh: University of Pittsburgh Press.
 Smith, T. J. (1998). The Collapse of the Lenin Personality Cult in Soviet Russia, 1985-1995. The Historian, 60(2), 325–343.

Other studies
 Erley, M. (2021). On Russian Soil: Myth and Materiality. DeKalb: Northern Illinois University Press.
 Hartley, J. M. (2021). The Volga: A History''. New Haven: Yale University Press.

Primary sources
 Under construction

Reference works
Below are reference works related to the history of Russia for background and context.

Academic journals
Below is a list of academic journals dealing with Eastern European and Slavic history referenced in this bibliography.

See also
 Bibliography of the history of the Early Slavs and Rus'
 Bibliography of Russian history (1223–1613)
 Bibliography of Russian history (1613–1917)
 Bibliography of the Russo-Japanese War
 Bibliography of Russia during World War I
 Bibliography of the Russian Revolution and Civil War
 Bibliography of Stalinism and the Soviet Union
 Bibliography of the Soviet Union during World War II
 Bibliography of the Post Stalinist Soviet Union
 Bibliography of Ukrainian history
 Bibliography of the history of Belarus and Byelorussia
 Bibliography of the history of Poland

Further reading
Below are book are chapter length bibliographies related to this period.

References

Notes

Citations

 
Bibliography
Bibliography
Bibliography
History (1991-present)
Russia